Javiar Lawrence Collins (born April 13, 1978) is a former American football offensive tackle in the National Football League for the Dallas Cowboys,  Carolina Panthers, Cleveland Browns and Denver Broncos. He was also a member of the Frankfurt Galaxy in NFL Europe. He played college football at Northwestern University.

Early years
Collins attended Saint Thomas Academy, where played football and basketball. As a senior defensive tackle, he collected 105 tackles, 9 sacks and 4 forced fumbles, receiving All-state, All-metro and All-conference honors.

He accepted a football scholarship from Northwestern University. As a redshirt freshman, he appeared in 8 games playing mainly on special teams.

As a sophomore he appeared in 12 games, starting 5 at defensive tackle, while registering 36 tackles (3 for loss) and one sack. As a junior, he posted 38 tackles and 4 sacks.

As a senior, he started at defensive tackle and was a part of a team that earned three-way tie for the Big Ten conference championship. He finished with 12 starts, 52 tackles (11 for loss), 3 sacks, 2 quarterback hurries, 1 fumble recovery and 1 forced fumble.

Professional career

Dallas Cowboys
Collins was signed as an undrafted free agent by the Dallas Cowboys after the 2001 NFL Draft. As a rookie, he was converted finto an offensive tackle in the first week of the regular season and was declared inactive for all 16 games. He was allocated to the Frankfurt Galaxy for the 2002 NFL Europe season, where he was named a starter.

In 2002, he appeared in 9 games, starting 4 games at right tackle, including the 17-14 loss to the Seattle Seahawks where running back Emmitt Smith broke the NFL all-time rushing record. In that same contest, he suffered a sprained MCL in his right knee, that forced him to miss 6 games, returning until the season finale. The next year, he was declared inactive in 14 games.

On August 24, 2004, after being demoted to third string, he was traded to the Carolina Panthers in exchange for a conditional draft choice (not exercised).

Carolina Panthers
Collins was waived by the Carolina Panthers on September 4, 2004.

Cleveland Browns
On October 20, 2004, he was signed as a free agent by the Cleveland Browns. He was released on November 4. On November 9, he was re-signed after Kelvin Garmon was placed on the injured reserve list. He was declared inactive in 9 games. He was released on August 28, 2005.

Denver Broncos
On January 3, 2006, Collins was signed by the Denver Broncos. He was cut on August 29.

References

External links
Just Sports Stats

Living people
1978 births
Players of American football from Saint Paul, Minnesota
American football offensive tackles
Northwestern Wildcats football players
Dallas Cowboys players
Frankfurt Galaxy players
Cleveland Browns players